Menara Astra is a skyscraper located at Jalan Jenderal Sudirman in Jakarta, Indonesia. It is an office building with 63 floors and a private helipad. The podium of the tower has retail space and a food court, and a 1,000-person capacity conference hall.

Menara Astra's customized office space has six-star amenities. A Toyota showroom occupies its first floor. 

Also in the same complex are the Anandamaya Residences on an area of 2.4-hectares, comprising three residential towers named Anandamaya Residences 1, 2 and 3. The total project cost US$600 million.

See also
 List of tallest buildings in Jakarta
 List of tallest buildings in Indonesia

References 

Buildings and structures completed in Jakarta in 2017
Buildings and structures in Jakarta
Post-independence architecture of Indonesia
Skyscraper office buildings in Indonesia
Residential skyscrapers in Indonesia
2017 establishments in Indonesia